St. Mary High School was a coeducational Catholic high school in Royal Oak, Michigan, United States.  It closed in 1985.

References

Defunct Catholic secondary schools in Michigan
Schools in Royal Oak, Michigan